Eduardo Joaquim Mulémbwè is a politician from Mozambique. He is a member of the FRELIMO party and president of the Assembly of the Republic of Mozambique from 1994 to 2009. He is also a member of the Pan-African Parliament.

References

Year of birth missing (living people)
Living people
Presidents of the Assembly of the Republic (Mozambique)
Members of the Pan-African Parliament from Mozambique
Recipients of the Eduardo Mondlane Order
FRELIMO politicians